Gilberto Meléndez (December 2, 1933 – June 15, 2016) was a Puerto Rican professional wrestler better known under the ring name Gypsy Joe. While attaining much of his United States success in the Tennessee area, Meléndez also gained a following in Japan. His career lasted six decades, and his highly physical brawling style and tough reputation made him an early pioneer of the hardcore wrestling scene.

Professional wrestling career

Early career
Meléndez began his wrestling career in 1951 at age 18. During a lengthy tenure in his native Puerto Rico, he went under various monikers and learned the ropes with the likes of Pedro Morales and Carlos Colón Sr. Meléndez made his United States debut at Sunnyside Garden in Long Island, New York in 1963. Primarily using the name Gypsy Joe by this point, he mainly worked for Nick Gulas and later Jerry Jarrett in the Southeastern region, particularly Mid-Southern Wrestling. During his Gulas run, he was often teamed with heels like Tojo Yamamoto, with whom he formed the No Pain Train, and The Cuban Assassin. He also joined forces with Frank Martinez to be collectively known as the Blue Infernos. The masked duo would attain tag team championships on numerous occasions. By the 1970s, Gypsy Joe was a local star of Chattanooga, Tennessee, regularly performing at Soldiers and Sailors Memorial Auditorium on Saturdays and appearing on local WDEF-TV. His career wasn't limited to the South, however, winning championships around the country as well as in Canada's Stampede Wrestling.

However, with the rise of national promotions like the World Wrestling Federation and World Championship Wrestling in the 1980s, the local industry that Joe had developed a career in began to dwindle. He would not be among those fortunate enough to find success in the major US promotions. Joe eventually made his way overseas into the Japanese wrestling scene, to work for All Japan Pro Wrestling where his highly physical brawling style akin to The Sheik and Abdullah the Butcher was met with success. Bloody encounters with the likes of Mr. Pogo and a penchant for taunting his opponents to attack him with weapons earned Joe a strong reputation in the death match scene and helped solidify his cult following in the region. Despite his aging body, Joe remained active in Japan throughout the '80s and '90s where he also refereed and mentored upcoming stars of the hardcore style.

Return to the United States and retirement
After many taxing years in the ring, an elderly Gypsy Joe returned to the United States in the 2000s where he performed on the independent circuit primarily in the Southeast. In 2001, he attended the International Wrestling Association's Juicio Final event held in his native Puerto Rico, where he received the recognition of the promotion.

In April 2003, a 69-year-old Joe faced New Jack in an infamous hardcore match before a small crowd. Due to Joe's no-selling throughout the match and headbutting New Jack hard on the nose, New Jack legitimately attacked Joe with a chain, a baseball bat wrapped in barbed wire, and several other weapons. With audience members angrily cursing Jack, the match ended in a chaotic no-contest and became a widely circulated viral video. New Jack was then arrested and charged with assault with a weapon.

During this period, although mainly working in his home state of Tennessee, the haggard Gypsy Joe maintained his reputation as a resilient veteran with indie appearances throughout the US. On July 30, 2005, he was enlisted as the special guest referee for CZW Tournament of Death IV held in New Castle, Delaware. The tournament featured various performers that credit Joe for pioneering the in-ring style they now emulate. In 2007, WWE Magazine named Gypsy Joe the world's oldest wrestler at the age of 73. On February 13, 2010, he appeared in the corner of Eddie Kingston and Necro Butcher as Butcher's mentor for their No Rules tag team match at the Ring of Honor 8th Anniversary Show in New York City.

Joe wrestled his last match at the Gypsy Joe retirement show on January 7, 2011. Held in Tullahoma, Tennessee by the Southern Wrestling Federation, the bout marked an end to a career which began 60 years prior.

Legacy
Although he never found success in major American promotions, Gypsy Joe is known for his longevity in the wrestling business, which spanned seven decades, as well as his innate toughness as a hardcore brawler. According to legend, he was the first wrestler ever to jump successfully off a steel cage onto an opponent. Joe's extensive career in Japan and participation in death matches solidified this fierce reputation, and his highly physical in-ring approach helped popularize the hardcore style.

Gypsy Joe was inducted into the Tennessee Wrestling Hall of Fame on November 7, 2015, by Mick Foley at Money Mark Productions' event "A Night with Foley" at the Nashville Fairgrounds.

Personal life
Meléndez was born in Orocovis, Puerto Rico and then moved to Tullahoma, Tennessee where he gained much of his US career success.

In August 2013, reports surfaced that, after a five-year struggle with gout, Meléndez had his right foot amputated. It was elaborated that the veteran wrestler had also been struggling with rickets and that his entire leg may need amputation. He died on June 15, 2016, from complications following an extended illness. He was buried at Maury Memorial Gardens in Columbia, Tennessee.

He was survived by a daughter named Jenee Beal and a nephew, Dan Wilson, who also served as his manager. He also has a first-born daughter by the name of Debralee Suzette Meléndez, born in New York, on November 4, 1953, and known as 
Debra S. Anello (her married name), and a daughter and son by another union: Jeannette Melendez and Gilberto Melendez Jr..

Championships and accomplishments
American International Wrestling
AIW West Virginia Heavyweight Championship (3 times)
Central States Wrestling
NWA Central States Tag Team Championship (1 time) – with Mr. Pogo
NWA Central States Television Championship (1 time)
NWA Southern Tag Team Championship (Georgia version) (1 time) – with Skull Murphy
International Championship Wrestling
ICW United States Tag Team Championship (1 time) – with Tojo Yamamoto
Mid-Atlantic Championship Wrestling
NWA Southern Tag Team Championship (Mid-Atlantic version) (1 time) - with Louis Tillet
NWA Mid-America
NWA Mid-America Tag Team Championship (7 times) – with Leroy Rochester (1), Dutch Mantel (1), Buzz Tyler (1), Tojo Yamamoto (3), and Tom Renesto, Jr. (1)
NWA Six-Man Tag Team Championship (1 time) – with Tojo Yamamoto & The Beast
NWA Southern Tag Team Championship (Mid-America version) (1 time) – with Frank Martinez
NWA World Brass Knuckles Championship (4 times)
NWA World Tag Team Championship (Mid-America version) (2 times) – with Frank Martinez
NWA Western States Sports
NWA Western States Tag Team Championship (1 time) - with Killer Tim Brooks
Pro Wrestling Illustrated
 PWI ranked him #432 of the top 500 singles wrestlers in the PWI 500 in 1991
Southern Wrestling Federation
SWF Hardcore Championship (1 time)
Stampede Wrestling
Stampede Wrestling International Tag Team Championship (1 time) - with Jim Wright
Tennessee Wrestling Alliance
TWA Hardcore Championship (2 times)
United States Wrestling Association
USWA Junior Heavyweight Championship (1 time)
World Wrestling Council
WWC North American Tag Team Championship (3 times) - with Infierno II

See also
Professional wrestling in Puerto Rico

References

External links
Gypsy Joe profile

1933 births
2016 deaths
20th-century professional wrestlers
21st-century professional wrestlers
American amputees
Sportspeople with limb difference
Expatriate professional wrestlers in Japan
Professional wrestling referees
People from Orocovis, Puerto Rico
Puerto Rican male professional wrestlers
Stampede Wrestling alumni
NWA World Light Heavyweight Champions
Stampede Wrestling International Tag Team Champions